Maximilian "Max" Freiherr von Speidel (13 September 1856 – 24 February 1943) was a Bavarian general and State Council at the Bavarian Ministry of War.

Life 
Von Speidel was born in Munich. In the rank of a General der Kavallerie, von Speidel was commander of the 6th Bavarian Reserve Division from 30 October to 16 November 1914, the unit in which Hitler served during World War I.

In the "Hertling Cabinet" he was acting as War Minister for a short time in 1916.,  before he became State Council from 26 November 1916 to 21 January 1919.

Upon agreement with Kurt Eisner and Albert Roßhaupter, on 10 November 1918 after the revolution, he and Otto von Dandl went to Schloss Wildenwart in the district of Rosenheim, where Von Speidel planned to persuade King Ludwig III to issue a declaration in which he would release the army officers of their oath, but Ludwig had already left Schloss Wildenwart. Two days later, Von Dandl could convince the king of the release of the officers of their oath.

Von Speidel was married to Anna Maria Karolina Maximiliane Erwine, Gräfin von Arco auf Valley. He died in his hometown.

Awards 
 Commendador of the Order of the Rose

External links 
 Photos: 1, 2

References and notes 

1856 births
1943 deaths
Bavarian Ministers of War
Bavarian generals
Barons of Germany
Military personnel from Munich
People from the Kingdom of Bavaria